Ghaibalishen or Qaybali is a village that is, de facto, in the Shushi Province of the Republic of Artsakh; de jure, it is part of the Shusha District of Azerbaijan, in the disputed region of Nagorno-Karabakh.

Toponymy 
The village is also known as Khaibalikend.

History 
According to the 1897 census, 381 Armenians and 133 Azerbaijanis lived in the village.

In June 1919, 600-700 Armenian inhabitants of Ghaibalishen and the neighboring villages of Jamilli, Karkijahan and Pahlul were massacred by armed Kurdish irregulars and Azerbaijani soldiers. Ghaibalishen was looted and burnt.

The village had an Azerbaijani-majority population prior to the First Nagorno-Karabakh War.

References

External links 
 

Populated places in Shushi Province
Populated places in Shusha District